Douglas Wilson (born January 7, 1999) is an American professional basketball player. He played college basketball for the Kirkwood CC Eagles and the South Dakota State Jackrabbits.

Early life and high school career
Wilson was born in Evanston, Illinois and grew up in Des Moines, Iowa and attended Herbert Hoover High School. Wilson averaged 17.9 points per game on 58.2 percent shooting and grabbed 309 rebounds as a senior. He was named All-Central Iowa Metro League.

College career
Wilson began his college career at Kirkwood Community College. As a freshman, he averaged 14.1 points, 6.6 rebounds and 1.9 blocks per game and was named a NJCAA Division II Second Team All-American. Following the end of the season, he committed to transfer to South Dakota State after his sophomore season. He averaged 21 points and 8.7 rebounds per game as a sophomore and was named a first team NJCAA All-American, the Iowa Community College Athletic Conference Player of the Year and the DII Player of the Year as he led the Eagles to the NJCAA Division II national championship.

Wilson became an immediate starter at power forward for the Jackrabbits. He was named the Summit League Men's Basketball Player of the Year and Newcomer of the Year as well as First Team All-Summit League recognition in his first season with the team. Wilson missed the Summit League quarterfinal loss to Purdue Fort Wayne with an injury. He averaged 18.7 points and 6.4 rebounds per game on a team that finished 22–10. As a senior, Wilson averaged 16.7 points, 5.4 rebounds and 2.3 assists per game, earning Second Team All-Summit League honors. He opted to return for an additional season of eligibility, granted by the NCAA due to the COVID-19 pandemic.

In 2022, Wilson was named to the First Team All-Summit League, while teammate Baylor Scheierman was named Player of the Year.

Career statistics

College

NCAA Division I

|-
| style="text-align:left;"| 2019–20
| style="text-align:left;"| South Dakota State
| 29 || 29 || 29.7 || .629 || .167 || .667 || 6.4 || 1.8 || .8 || .8 || 18.7
|-
| style="text-align:left;"| 2020–21
| style="text-align:left;"| South Dakota State
| 19 || 18 || 28.6 || .506 || – || .611 || 5.4 || 2.3 || 1.2 || .6 || 16.7
|-
| style="text-align:left;"| 2021–22
| style="text-align:left;"| South Dakota State
| 34 || 34 || 25.0 || .569 || .333 || .684 || 5.5 || 1.6 || .9 || .6 || 16.4
|- class="sortbottom"
| style="text-align:center;" colspan="2"| Career
| 82 || 81 || 27.5 || .576 || .250 || .659 || 5.8 || 1.8 || .9 || .7 || 17.3

JUCO

|-
| style="text-align:left;"| 2017–18
| style="text-align:left;"| Kirkwood CC
| 30 || 30 || 23.0 || .692 || – || .462 || 6.6 || .6 || .5 || 1.9 || 14.1
|-
| style="text-align:left;"| 2018–19
| style="text-align:left;"| Kirkwood CC
| 34 || 33 || 25.2 || .670 || 1.000 || .700 || 8.7 || 2.4 || .9 || 1.8 || 21.0
|- class="sortbottom"
| style="text-align:center;" colspan="2"| Career
| 64 || 63 || 24.2 || .679 || 1.000 || .621 || 7.7 || 1.6 || .7 || 1.8 || 17.8

References

External links
South Dakota State Jackrabbits bio
Kirkwood CC Eagles bio

1999 births
Living people
African-American basketball players
American men's basketball players
Basketball players from Des Moines, Iowa
Junior college men's basketball players in the United States
Kirkwood Community College alumni
South Dakota State Jackrabbits men's basketball players
21st-century African-American sportspeople
Power forwards (basketball)